Yadanar Oo is a Burmese singer.

Music career

A live show, titled From A Distance, was held on March 6, 2016, at Gandamar Hotel in Yangon with singers May Sweet and Mimi Win Pe.

Discography

Albums
Sie Taw Gyi (စည်တော်ကြီး)
Myat Noe Thu (မြတ်နိုးသူ)
Chit Thu (2014)
Hlaine See Yin Thachinnsomaal

Collaborative albums
From A Distance (2012 and 2016 Live Show)
Chee Moon Chin Mha Ta Par (2018)

References

21st-century Burmese actresses
21st-century Burmese women singers
Burmese singer-songwriters
Year of birth missing (living people)
Living people